Västervik Speedway are a motorcycle speedway team from Västervik in Sweden. They ride in the Elitserien and are one time champions of Sweden.

History
They were established as Skepparna in 1966 and have raced in the Elitserien, the top league division of Swedish speedway, since 1991, changing their name to Västervik in 1993. 

They were Elitserien Champions in 2005 and they finished runners-up to Dackarna in 2007. The team was managed by Peter Helgesson and Marvyn Cox and former riders include 1993 World Champion Sam Ermolenko and Australia national speedway team manager Craig Boyce.

In 2023, the team signed three times world champion Tai Woffinden.

Season summary

Teams

2023 team
 Tai Woffinden
 Bartosz Smektała
 Mads Hansen
 David Bellego
 Anton Karlsson
 Jacob Thorssell

Previous teams

2012 team
 Jurica Pavlič 1.889
 Chris Harris 1.669
 Tomasz Jedrzejak 1.520
 Danny King 1.508
 Dave Watt 1.500
 Rafał Okoniewski 1.432
 Peter Ljung 1.393
 Mikael Max 1.383
 Pontus Aspgren 0.973

2022 team
 Mads Hansen
 Fredrik Lindgren
 Bartosz Smektała
 Paweł Przedpełski
 Jaimon Lidsey
 Kenneth Bjerre 
 Peter Ljung
 Anton Karlsson
/ Gleb Chugunov

References 

Swedish speedway teams
Västervik
Sport in Kalmar County